William Somervell Mann (14 February 19245 September 1989) was an English music critic. Born in India, he was educated at Winchester and Cambridge, studying music with several prominent composers, before taking up a career as a critic.

For most of his career he was on the staff of The Times in London, where his radical views were in contrast with the paper's traditional outlook. He published many books and articles in musical journals.

After leaving The Times Mann was director of the Bath Festival for a year.

Life and career
Mann was born in Madras, India, the son of Gerald and Joyce Mann. He was educated at the Dragon School and Winchester, after which he took lessons in London, studying the piano with Ilona Kabos and composition with Mátyás Seiber. He was at Magdalene College, Cambridge from 1946 to 1948, studying with the composers Patrick Hadley and Robin Orr and the organist Hubert Middleton.

On leaving Cambridge in 1948 Mann joined The Times in London. In the same year he married Erika Charlotte Emilie Sohler, with whom he had four daughters. He remained at The Times for 34 years, first as assistant music critic (1948–60) and then as chief music critic (1960–82). Although the paper in the post-war decades was generally conservative and traditional, Mann was, as a colleague described him, "markedly progressive, even iconoclastic, in outlook." In 1958 Mann contributed the libretto to Franz Reizenstein's Let's Fake an Opera, produced for the 1958 Hoffnung Music Festival. It consisted of "ridiculously juxtaposed excerpts from more than forty operas, which delighted both Reizenstein and the audience".

Mann was one of the first music critics to see serious artistic value in rock music. He achieved some notoriety for his assertion that the Beatles were "the greatest songwriters since Schubert". Most unusually for a serious music critic, he appeared as a panellist on the television pop music programme "Juke Box Jury". As a broadcaster, however, he was better known as a regular contributor to the BBC Third Programme (later BBC Radio 3). He contributed reviews to The Gramophone for many years.

In 1985 Mann was director of the Bath Festival in succession to Sir William Glock.

Mann died in Bath at the age of 65.

Publications
 Hermann Scherchen: The Nature of Music (Mann's translation of Vom Wesen der Musik), 1950
Introduction to the Music of J. S. Bach, 1950
Benjamin Britten (contributor to symposium), 1952
The Concerto (contributor), 1952
The Record Guide (contributor), 1955
Chamber Music, 1957
The Analytical Concert Guide (editor), 1957
Music and Western Man (contributor), 1958
Let's Fake an Opera (with Franz Reizenstein), 1958
Richard Strauss's Operas, 1964
Wagner's The Ring' Introduction and Translation, 1964
Michael Tippett (contributor), 1965
Wagner's Tristan, Introduction and Translation, 1968
The Operas of Mozart, 1977
Opera on Record (contributor), vol. 1 1979, vol. 2 1983, vol. 3 1984
Music in Time, 1982
The Book of the Violin (contributor), 1984

Articles:

 "Feuersnot: a more positive view of Strauss", The Listener, 10 September 1964, p. 406

Notes

1924 births
1989 deaths
Alumni of Magdalene College, Cambridge
English musicologists
English music critics
The Times people
20th-century British musicologists
Presidents of the Critics' Circle
British people in colonial India